Heinz Simmet (born 22 November 1944) is a retired German football player. He played 419 games in the Bundesliga and scored 55 goals.

Honours
1. FC Köln
 Bundesliga: 1977–78
 DFB-Pokal: 1967–68, 1976–77, 1977–78

References

External links
 

1944 births
Living people
German footballers
Germany under-21 international footballers
Germany B international footballers
Rot-Weiss Essen players
1. FC Köln players
Bundesliga players
Association football midfielders
Borussia Neunkirchen players